Senthamizh Selvan is a 1994 Indian Tamil-language action drama film, written and directed by Manoj Kumar. The film stars Prashanth and Madhoo , while music was given by M. S. Viswanathan and Ilaiyaraaja as a team.

Plot 

Vijay Bhoopathy and Sundarapandian have been friends. Bhoopathy is an atheist, while Sundarapandian is a temple priest. Bhoopathy's son Selvan and Sundarapandian's daughter Vaidegi fall in love with each other. Muthukalai is Vijayakumar's brother-in-law. His daughter Meenakshi is also madly in love and vows to marry Selvan. Against their families' wishes, Prashanth and Madhoo elope. Ever since, the two families hate each other, later Bhoopathy is murdered in front of his wife Janaki, who becomes mentally sick of the shock. Selvan comes to the village, announces that he is the son of Bhoopathy and trying to treat his mentally affected mother. Sundarapandian tries to kill Selvan to claim the huge property left by Prashanth's father. How Selvan saves the mother, property and how he marries Madhoo forms the rest of the story.

Cast 
Prashanth as Selvan
Madhoo as Vaidegi
Sivaranjani as Meenakshi
Sujatha as Janaki
Vijayakumar as Zamindar Vijay Bhoopathy
Mohan Natrajan as Sundarapandian
Chandrasekhar as Muthukalai
Shanmugasundaram as Shanmugasundaram
Senthil as Vellaichamy
Charle

Soundtrack 
The songs were composed by M. S. Viswanathan, while Orchestration and BGM were composed by Ilaiyaraaja, with lyrics written by Vaali.

Reception 
K. Vijiyan of New Straits Times criticised the film for its abundance of songs, adding, "I have lost count of the numerous movies where one man reigns over a village using violence and there seems to be no law or order. Sadly, [Senthamizh Selvan] is another film in this genre, with nothing much to make it memorable or outstanding". Indolink wrote "Manoj Kumar fails in all three departments -Screenplay, dialogues and direction. Skip it!". Thulasi of Kalki wrote except for cinematography and art direction, the film has nothing else to talk about.

References

External links 
 

Indian action drama films
1994 films
Films scored by Ilaiyaraaja
Films scored by M. S. Viswanathan
1990s Tamil-language films
1990s action drama films